Gosport bus station is a bus station in Gosport, England.

History 
The bus station was constructed in the 1970s. There have been plans to redevelop the bus station since 2012. Current proposals involve building a new bus station north of the current station, on the site of a taxi rank. In 2021, the site of the current bus station was put up for sale.

References 

Gosport
Bus stations in England